Ambilobea is a genus of flowering plants belonging to the family Burseraceae. It is a dioecious tree or shrub, up about 20 m tall. Leaves are alternate, odd-pinnate. Inflorescences are axillary and flowers are inconspicuous.

Its native range is Madagascar.

It currently contains only one species: Ambilobea madagascariensis

References

Burseraceae
Burseraceae genera
Monotypic Sapindales genera
Dioecious plants